The 2013 Superettan, part of the 2013 Swedish football season, was the 13th season of Sweden's second-tier football league in its current format. The 2013 fixtures were released on 18 December 2012. The season started on 6 April 2013 and ended on 2 November 2013.

Falkenbergs FF won Superettan this season, their first title and were thus promoted to Allsvenskan for the first time along with runners-up Örebro SK who returned to the top flight after one years absence. GIF Sundsvall advanced to the promotion play-offs but failed to win against Halmstads BK.

A total of 16 teams contested the league; 11 returning from the 2012 season, three that were relegated from Allsvenskan and three that were promoted from Division 1.

Teams 
A total of 16 teams contested the league, 11 returning from the 2012 season, three relegated from the 2012 Allsvenskan and two promoted from the 2012 Division 1. The top two teams qualified directly for promotion to Allsvenskan, the third had to play a play-off against the fourteenth team from Allsvenskan to decide who would play in Allsvenskan 2014. The bottom two teams qualified directly for relegation to Division 1, the thirteenth and the fourteenth had to play a play-off against the numbers two teams from Division 1 Södra and Division 1 Norra to decide who would play in Superettan 2014.

2012-champions Östers IF and runner-up IF Brommapojkarna were promoted to the Allsvenskan at the end of the 2012 season. They were replaced by Örebro SK and GAIS, furthermore third placed Halmstads BK replaced GIF Sundsvall as an Allsvenskan team after winning the deciding play-offs. Trelleborgs FF and Umeå FC were relegated at the end of the 2012 season after finishing in the bottom two places of the table. They were replaced by Division 1 Norra champions Östersunds FK and Division 1 Södra champions Örgryte IS.

Stadia and locations

 1 Correct as of end of 2012 season

Personnel and kits

Note: Flags indicate national team as has been defined under FIFA eligibility rules. Players and Managers may hold more than one non-FIFA nationality.

Managerial changes

Suspended matches

Hammarby IF vs. GAIS
The match on 19 September 2013 at Tele2 Arena between Hammarby IF and GAIS was suspended after 57 minutes of play, following confrontations among the spectators. About 40 people made their way directly above the part of the stands where the GAIS supporters were and threw objects directed at them. Confrontations between the spectators then occurred at the southwest part of the arena, with no injuries requiring hospital care reported. About 20 to 25 minutes later, the match was resumed. GAIS filed an appeal for a 3–0 fixed result in their favour, but the appeal was rejected by the Swedish Football Association (SvFF). On 10 October 2013 the SvFF announced Hammarby IF was given a 250,000 SEK fine and that no attendance will be allowed for two upcoming home games.

Örgryte IS vs. Ljungskile SK
The match on 28 October 2013 at Gamla Ullevi between Örgryte IS and Ljungskile SK had to be postponed to 29 October because of dangerous weather conditions.

League table

Relegation play-offs

IFK Värnamo won 5–2 on aggregate. 

Varbergs BoIS won 3–1 on aggregate.

Positions by round

Results

Season statistics

Top scorers

Top assists

Top goalkeepers

(Minimum of 10 games played)

Hat-tricks

Attendance

See also 
Competitions
 2013 Allsvenskan
 2013 Swedish football Division 1
 2012–13 Svenska Cupen
 2013 Svenska Supercupen

References

External links
 
 Official website 

Superettan seasons
2
Sweden
Sweden